Paddy Conneely (or Coneely) (died 11 September 1851) was a blind Irish piper and singer.

Life
He was known as "The Galway Piper", referring to his long-time period of residence in this region. Conneely was supported by James Hardiman, who presented Conneely with his pipes, made in the 1820s.

His music was transcribed by a number of collectors including Henry Hudson (1798–1889), George Petrie, William Forde, and Henry Westenra, 3rd Baron Rossmore, amounting to some 180 tunes. Most of his music manuscripts are now housed in the National Library of Ireland, the Boston Public Library, and the University of Notre Dame's library.

Frederic William Burton painted his portrait in 1839, and an engraved portrait based on the painting was published in an article by George Petrie in an 1840 issue of The Irish Penny Journal, making him probably the first folk musician to have had his likeness adorn the cover of a widely read journal.

Upon his death, his two sons were taken into care by the Christian Brothers.

Bibliography
 George Petrie: "Paddy Coneely, the Galway Piper", in: The Irish Penny Journal vol. 1 (1840) no. 4, pp. 105–108.
 James O'Brien Moran: Paddy Conneely, the Galway Piper: The Legacy of a Pre-famine Folk Musician (PhD thesis, University of Limerick, 2006)

See also
 Donell Dubh Ó Cathail, harper to Elizabeth I, c. 1560s–c.1660.
 Gearóid de Barra, d. 1899
 Tarlach Mac Suibhne, fl. 1893
 Martin O'Reilly, died 1904

References

External links
 http://billhaneman.ie/IMM/IMM-XIX.html
 http://www.itma.ie/digitallibrary/print-collection/citizen/
 http://www.clarelibrary.ie/eolas/coclare/people/frederic_william_burton.htm

Year of birth missing
1851 deaths
19th-century Irish people
Blind musicians
Irish uilleann pipers
Musicians from County Galway